The Condor is a 2007 American animated superhero film based on a character created by Stan Lee. It features the voices of Wilmer Valderrama, María Conchita Alonso, Kathleen Barr, Michael Dobson, Mary Elizabeth McGlynn, and Cusse Mankuma. Originally titled El Lobo, it was released under the Stan Lee Presents banner, which is a series of direct-to-DVD animated films distributed by POW Entertainment with Anchor Bay Entertainment. The story was by Stan Lee, with the script written by former The New Teen Titans writer Marv Wolfman. The film is set in the same world as Mosaic, a prior Stan Lee Presents film, with the film's events apparently occurring before the events of Mosaic. The Condor was released on DVD on March 20, 2007, and had its television premiere on Cartoon Network on March 24, 2007. Since then, the film has been poorly received.

Plot
In San Diego, California, a mysterious criminal called Taipan uses a mind controlling, performance enhancement device to manipulate an old man into robbing a store, only for it to cause the latter to die from a heart attack. The next morning, college dropout and professional skater Tony Valdez saves his cousin Reuban from a gang before entering a skating competition with help from Sammi, an old friend of the family's. After winning the first round, Tony encounters a woman named Valeria, and they flirt with each other. While meeting with his parents, his mother gives him a condor amulet. Later that night, Tony is led to believe his parents are criminals when he overhears them discussing an error in their research with their business partner, Nigel Harrington. His parents attempt to explain themselves the next day, but Tony storms off. During the competition's second round, a mysterious man sabotages his board, causing him to lose. Tony's parents try to go to the police, only to be suddenly ambushed by mind-controlled skaters who cause them to crash. Tony hears of the accident and finds his parents dead before being ambushed and paralyzed by the same skaters.

While in recovery, Tony is sent to therapy under former surfer Dogg. Meanwhile, Sammi starts going out with Tony's rival Z-Man and gives Tony enhanced boots. Using them, Tony becomes the Condor to fight crime and figure out what his parents were involved in. While on a date with Valeria, he learns his parents were unearthed and falls into a trap set up by Taipan. During the fight, Tony discovers Nigel hired Taipan to kill his parents for trying to report the error. Severely wounded, Tony manages to escape and goes to Sammi for help, apologizing for his behavior and realizing his feelings for her. However, Reuban interrupts, revealing he sabotaged Tony's board because he was ungrateful. Tony gets a call from Valeria, so he leaves to check on her while Sammi discovers the error in question. Upon reaching Valeria's house, Tony learns she is Taipan and gets into a fight with her. Valeria leaves him for dead and attempts to use a selfish Reuban to kill Sammi.

Surviving the attack, Tony receives help from Z-Man and befriends him as they save Sammi and Dogg from a fire Reuban and Valeria started. Elsewhere, Nigel holds an auction, only to be betrayed and murdered by Valeria, who takes control. However, Tony arrives and foils her plans. Amidst their ensuing fight, the building is set ablaze, trapping Valeria. Tony tries to save her, but she attempts to kill him, falling into the fire.

Sometime later, Tony has entered a relationship with Sammi and entered a new competition with Z-Man. Unbeknownst to them, a mysterious clan retrieves Valeria's body and her mind control device so they can use it for their own plans.

Cast
 Wilmer Valderrama as Tony Valdez/The Condor
 María Conchita Alonso as Maria Valdez
 Kathleen Barr as Sammi
 Mary Elizabeth McGlynn as Valeria/Taipan
 Michael Dobson as Nigel Harrington
 Scott McNeil as Dogg
 Cusse Mankuma as Z-Man
 Sam Vincent as Reuben
 Alessandro Juliani as Chato
 John Novak as George Valdez
 Matt Hill as Skragg
 France Perras as Fragg
 Stan Lee as Grandfather

Reception

References

External links
 
 SuperHeroHype Interview
 TV Guide Interview

2007 films
2007 animated films
American superhero films
Works by Stan Lee
2000s American animated films
2000s animated superhero films
Toonami
Films about Mexican Americans
Films produced by Stan Lee
Films set in San Diego
Films about mind control
Films with screenplays by Stan Lee
2000s English-language films